Czenglish, a portmanteau of the words Czech and English, refers to the interlanguage of English heavily influenced by Czech pronunciation, vocabulary, grammar or syntax spoken by learners of English as a second language. The term Czenglish is first recorded in 1989, with the slightly earlier variant Czechlish recorded from 1982.

Characteristics

Another typical aspect is the absence of definite articles (due to the lack of articles in Czech) and the use of "some" in place of an indefinite article. Voiced consonants at the end of words like "big" are pronounced unvoiced;  "ng" is understood as a /ng/ sequence and therefore follows the final devoicing rule (e.g. to sing merges with to sink ).

Reception
Most elements of Czenglish only cause little confusion and are eventually understood by a native speaker. Some, however, may lead to embarrassing situations, since to a native English speaker they seem to be correct English sentences, although the Czech speaker meant to say something different. Such misunderstanding may be recognized only by considering the appropriateness of each of the possible meanings in the given context. Czechs in general tend to be openly hostile to one another's grammar mistakes, both in English and Czech.

See also
Bohemisms

References

Further reading

External links
 Common Czenglish mistakes (based on Sparling's book)

Macaronic forms of English
Czech language